Presidential elections were held in Bangladesh on 3 June 1978. They were the first direct elections for the presidency, as the president had previously been elected by the Jatiya Sangsad. The result was a victory for Ziaur Rahman, who received 76.6% of the vote. Turnout was 54.3%.

Campaign
Prior to the elections six parties backing Ziaur Rahman – the Bangladesh Labour Party, the Bangladesh Muslim League, the Bangladesh Scheduled Caste Federation, Jatiyatabadi Ganatantrik Dal, the National Awami Party (Bhashani) and the United Peoples' Party – formed the Jatiyatabadi Front (Nationalist Front) to support his candidacy.

M. A. G. Osmani was also supported by an alliance of six parties under the name Ganatantrik Oikkya Jote (United Democratic Alliance). The alliance consisted of the Awami League, the Communist Party, the Gano Adaji League, the Jatiya Janata Party, the National Awami Party (Muzaffar) and the People's League.

A group of parties led by Ataur Rahman boycotted the elections, including the Democratic League, the Islamic Democratic League, Jatiya Dal, the Jatiya League and the Krishak Sramik Party.

Results

References

President
Bangladesh
Presidential elections in Bangladesh
President